Dicroerisma is a genus of dinoflagellates belonging to the family Dicroerismataceae.

Species:
 Dicroerisma psilonereiella F.J.R.Taylor & S.A.Cattell

References

Gymnodiniales
Dinoflagellate genera